Parliamentary elections were held in Portugal on 8 November 1953. The ruling National Union won all 120 seats.

Electoral system
The elections were held using 21 multi-member constituencies and one single-member constituency covering the Azores, together electing a total of 120 members, 13 of which were from Portuguese colonies.

Voters could delete names from the lists of candidates, but could not replace them. Suffrage was given to all men aged 21 or over as long as they were literate or paid over 100 escudos in taxation, and to women aged over 21 if they had completed secondary education, or if they were the head of a household and met the same literacy and tax criteria as men.

Campaign
The opposition to the Estado Novo, consisting of anti-communist liberals, republicans and intellectuals, presented three lists with a total of 28 candidates in Lisbon, Oporto and Aveiro. The elections were boycotted by the National Democratic Movement and the Youth Movement for Democratic Union in protest at a lack of freedom, whilst monarchists boycotted the elections except in cases where a National Union candidate was a known royalist.

Results

References

See also
Politics of Portugal
List of political parties in Portugal
Elections in Portugal

Legislative elections in Portugal
Portugal
1953 elections in Portugal
November 1953 events in Europe